Scenic Blast (foaled 2004) is a Thoroughbred racehorse trained in Australia. His first group win was in the HDF McNeil Stakes. In 2009, he won three group one races, the Lightning Stakes, Newmarket Handicap and the King's Stand Stakes. He was the Australian Horse Of The Year in 2009.

References
Scenic Blast's pedigree and racing stats
racing Stats on racingandsports.com.au

2004 racehorse births
Thoroughbred family 8
Racehorses bred in Australia
Racehorses trained in Australia
Racehorses trained in the United States